Kanchalan is a rural locality (a selo) in Anadyrsky District of Chukotka Autonomous Okrug, Russia, located northwest of Anadyr, the administrative center of the autonomous okrug. As of the 2010 Census, its population was 629, with an estimated population as of 1 January 2015 of 525.

Geography
Kanchalan is located on the banks of the Kanchalan, one of the three rivers which, together with the Anadyr and the Belaya, flows into the Bering Sea at the Gulf of Anadyr.

History
The river Kanchalan, on the right bank of which Kanchalan stands, was shown as the Nerpichya on the 17th–18th century maps. The sedentary Chukchi people living in the vicinity were calling themselves konchalyt (lit. the onlies), that name, in the form of "Kanchalan", transferred first to the river and eventually to the inhabited locality.

Modern Kanchalan was founded in 1952.

Administrative and municipal status
Within the framework of administrative divisions, Kanchalan is subordinated to Anadyrsky District. Within the framework of municipal divisions, Kanchalan is a part of Kanchalan Rural Settlement within Anadyrsky Municipal District.

Economy
As with many of the rural localities throughout Chukotka, the population of Kanchalan is overwhelmingly indigenous (around 90%), mainly Chukchi. The main economic driver is reindeer herding, although there is also seasonal fishing near the mouth of the Gyrmekuul River. Residents maintain traditional methods of reindeer husbandry. Kanchalan's infrastructure includes a store, a communication center, a school, and a house of culture. In 2004, Kanchalan underwent a major repair project where all housing was repaired and 110 new houses built.

Transport
Kanchalan is not connected to the outside world by any road network.

Demographics
As of the 2010 Census, Kanchalan's population was 629, In remained essentially flat for the past several years, with the 2003 estimate reported in the 2005 environmental impact report produced for the Kupol Gold Project being 635. Of that population, 540 were of indigenous origin.

Religion
Kanchalan's religious facilities include a Russian Orthodox church dedicated to Saints Peter and Paul.

Climate
Kanchalan has a continental subarctic climate (Dfc). It experiences extremely cold winters. Temperatures generally do not rise above freezing between the beginning of October and the following May and are generally below  between the beginning of December and the following March. The summer is short and mild with temperatures averaging above  in July only, although record temperatures of nearly  have been recorded.

See also
List of inhabited localities in Anadyrsky District

References

Notes

Sources
 
 
Bema Gold Corporation. Environmental Impact Assessment, Kupol Gold Project, Far East Russia, June 2005.

Rural localities in Chukotka Autonomous Okrug